Inachus is a genus of crab, containing the following species:
Inachus aguiarii Brito Capello, 1876
Inachus angolensis Capart, 1951
Inachus biceps Manning & Holthuis, 1981
Inachus communissimus Rizza, 1839
Inachus complectens (Rathbun, 1911)
Inachus dorsettensis (Pennant, 1777)
Inachus grallator Manning & Holthuis, 1981
Inachus guentheri (Miers, 1879)
Inachus leptochirus Leach, 1817
Inachus mauritanicus Lucas, 1846
Inachus nanus Manning & Holthuis, 1981
Inachus phalangium (Fabricius, 1775)
Inachus thoracicus Roux, 1830

References

Majoidea